River Bluff High School is one of three public high schools in Lexington, South Carolina, United States. It provides education for ninth to twelfth grades for the town of Lexington and parts of Lake Murray, Oak Grove and West Columbia. It is located on the eastern side of Lexington, the school overlooks the Saluda River and a few hundred feet from Interstate 20 and U.S. Highway 378.

History
Construction began in January 2011 and was completed in August 2013. The construction process was overseen by Cumming Construction Management and contracted by China Construction America of South Carolina. It was constructed with many windows to reduce the cost of lighting. Students receive materials delivered online rather than through textbooks. Construction cost $138.9 million, authorized by voters in 2008.

In 2023, the parents of a student sued a teacher, principal, and other education officials, claiming the student was assaulted for not stopping to recite the Pledge of Allegiance.

Athletics

Championships 

All championships are 5A unless otherwise noted.

State Championships (8)
Cheerleading: 2013 (AAA)
Boys' soccer: 2016 (AAAA)
Wrestling: 2017
Girls' tennis: 2017, 2019
Boys' basketball: 2021
Swimming state champions:
Brian Loos 100 yd breaststroke: 2016
Matthew Swain 100 yd breaststroke: 2021
Maecy Wells 100 yd butterfly: 2022

Bands
The River Bluff High School Marching Band is a 4 time Lower State champion in both Class AAA (2013) and AAAA (2014, 2015, 2017).

The school's Indoor Percussion Ensemble won the SCBDA Indoor Percussion Championships for class AA in 2015. In the 2016 season, it advanced to competition in Class A and was placed second at SCBDA and third at its first appearance at the CWEA Circuit Championships.

Feeder schools
Via Meadow Glen Middle School and Lexington Middle School:
Lexington Elementary
Meadow Glen Elementary
Midway Elementary school 
New Providence Elementary
Oak Grove Elementary
Beachwood Middle school
Meadow Glen Middle School
Lakeside Middle School

References

Schools in Lexington County, South Carolina
Public high schools in South Carolina
2013 establishments in South Carolina